Karl Christoph "Carlo" Schäfer (2 January 1964 – 8 September 2015) was a German author of crime novels.

Life 
Carlo Schäfer was born in Heidelberg. He grew up as the youngest of three children in Pforzheim in Germany, his father was a Protestant priest there. After leaving school, Schäfer studied German at the University of Heidelberg, but he soon changed to studying at the Heidelberg University of Education. After studying, he worked for ten years as a secondary school teacher in Mannheim. Since 2003 Schäfer has been a lecturer at the Heidelberg University of Education (Institute for German language and literature and its didactics).

Schäfer was also a musician and cabaret performer. From 2002 he has been widely known as a crime author.

His protagonist, Detective Theurer, is a brooding, disillusioned man in his mid-fifties. He died in Heidelberg in 2015.

Bibliography 
 Im falschen Licht 2002
 Der Keltenkreis 2003
 Das Opferlamm 2004
 Silberrücken 2006
 Schlusslicht 2007 (Der letzte Band der Reihe)
Novels that do not take place in Heidelberg:
 Kinder und Wölfe 2007
 Schattendasein (Jugendkrimi) 2010
 Verdachtsmomente (Zweiter Band der Jugendreihe) 2010

References

External links 
 Homepage von Carlo Schäfer

German crime writers
Writers from Heidelberg
1964 births
2015 deaths
Heidelberg University alumni
German male writers